Sancaklı may refer to:

 Sancaklı, Elâzığ
 Sancaklı, İzmir, village in Izmir Province, Turkey
 Saffet Sancaklı, Turkish footballer

Turkish-language surnames